Gamaliel Bradford VI (October 9, 1863 – April 11, 1932) was an American biographer, critic, poet, and dramatist. Born in Boston, Massachusetts, the sixth of seven men called Gamaliel Bradford in unbroken succession, of whom the first, Gamaliel Bradford, was a great-grandson of Governor William Bradford of the Plymouth Colony. His grandfather, Dr. Gamaliel Bradford of Boston, was a noted abolitionist.

Early life
Bradford attended Harvard University briefly with the class of 1886, then continued his education with a private tutor, but is said to have been educated "mainly by ill-health and a vagrant imagination."  As an adult, Bradford lived in Wellesley, Massachusetts.  The building and student newspaper for the Wellesley High School (where Sylvia Plath received her secondary school education) were named after Gamaliel Bradford.  The town changed the name of the building to Wellesley High School, but the newspaper maintains Bradford's name.

Career
In his day Bradford was regarded as the "Dean of American Biographers."  He is acknowledged as the American pioneer of the psychographic form of written biographies, after the style developed by Lytton Strachey.  Despite suffering poor health during most of his life, Bradford wrote 114 biographies over a period of 20 years.

He was friends with fellow Harvard University graduate and poet, George Faunce Whitcomb, as he inscribed the book, Jewels of Romance with the words: To Gamaliel Bradford with deepest gratitude, George Faunce Whitcomb, Easter 1930 Brookline, Massachusetts.

Death
Bradford died on April 11, 1932 in Wellesley, Massachusetts.

Bibliography

 A Pageant of Life (poetry)
 A Prophet of Joy (poetry)
 Shadow Verses (poetry)
 Unmade in Heaven (drama), 1917.
 Lee, the American, 1912.
 American Portraits, 1875-1900
 Union Portraits, 1916.
 Confederate Portraits, 1914.
 Portraits of Women
 Portraits of American Women, 1919.
 Saints and Sinners, 1932.
 A Naturalist of Souls: Studies in Psychography (reprinted in part from various periodicals), 1917.
 Life and I (autobiography)
 Elizabethan Women, 1936.

Articles
 "Government in the United States," The Contemporary Review, Vol. XLVIII, July/December 1885.
 "Municipal Government," Scribners, October 1887.
 "A Hero's Conscience: A Study of Robert E. Lee," The Atlantic Monthly, Vol. CVI, December 1910, pp. 730–39.
 "Journalism and Permanence," The North American Review, August 1915.
 "A Confederate Pepys," The American Mercury, December 1925.

References

"Gamaliel Bradford" Encyclopædia Britannica: Online, student article; on-line source, accessed: 4 May 2007.
Bradford, Gamaliel, 1863-1932. Correspondence: Guide; Houghton Library, Harvard College Library, Harvard University; on-line source, accessed: 4 May 2007.

External links
 
 
 Gamaliel Bradford letters at Columbia University. Rare Book & Manuscript Library.

1863 births
1932 deaths
Writers from Boston
American biographers
American male biographers
Poets from Massachusetts
American male poets
Members of the American Academy of Arts and Letters